
Gmina Jastrzębia is a rural gmina (administrative district) in Radom County, Masovian Voivodeship, in east-central Poland. Its seat is the village of Jastrzębia, which lies approximately 12 kilometres (7 mi) north-east of Radom and 83 km (51 mi) south of Warsaw.

Villages
Gmina Jastrzębia contains the villages and settlements of Bartodzieje, Brody, Dąbrowa Jastrzębska, Dąbrowa Kozłowska, Goryń, Jastrzębia, Kozłów, Lesiów, Lewaszówka, Mąkosy Nowe, Mąkosy Stare, Olszowa, Owadów, Wojciechów, Wola Goryńska, Wola Owadowska, Wólka Lesiowska and Wolska Dąbrowa.

Neighbouring gminas
Gmina Jastrzębia is bordered by the city of Radom and by the gminas of Głowaczów, Jedlińsk, Jedlnia-Letnisko and Pionki.

References
Polish official population figures 2006

Jastrzebia
Radom County